Dorofk may refer to:
 Dorofk-e Olya
 Dorofk-e Sofla